The Cervera Mountains is an  long mountain range in the Baix Maestrat comarca, Valencian Community, Spain. In some ancient texts these mountains are known as Serra d'en Menor. Its highest point is Revoltons, . Other notable summits are Perdiguera,  and Mola, .

Location
The Cervera Mountains rise north of the Cervera del Maestrat town, south of Traiguera and east of La Jana. They are located in the transitional zone between the Mediterranean and the continental climate. In the winter the weather is colder than in the coastal mountain ranges and the summits are often covered in snow for a few days after each snowstorm.

The Our Lady of health shrine (Reial Santuari de Nostra Senyora de la Font de la Salut) which was first built in the 14th century is located on the eastern side of these mountains.
The mountains are mostly covered with Mediterranean Maquis shrubland. There are some patches of pine forest.

See also
Mountains of the Valencian Community
Maestrat/Maestrazgo

References

Flora de la Província de Castelló

External links
El País Valencià poble a poble; comarca a comarca - El Baix Maestrat
Traiguera
Cattle-rearing

Mountain ranges of the Valencian Community
Baix Maestrat
Mountain ranges of the Sistema Ibérico